In mathematics, particularly in functional analysis and convex analysis, a  is a series of the form  where  are all elements of a topological vector space , and all  are non-negative real numbers that sum to  (that is, such that ).

Types of Convex series 

 The convex series is called  if  is a Cauchy series, which by definition means that the sequence of partial sums  is a Cauchy sequence.

Types of subsets 

Convex series allow for the definition of special types of subsets that are well-behaved and useful with very good stability properties.

If  is a subset of a topological vector space  then  is said to be a: 

  if any convergent convex series with elements of  has its (each) sum in  
 In this definition,  is not required to be Hausdorff, in which case the sum may not be unique. In any such case we require that every sum belong to 
  or a  if there exists a Fréchet space  such that  is equal to the projection onto  (via the canonical projection) of some cs-closed subset  of  Every cs-closed set is lower cs-closed and every lower cs-closed set is lower ideally convex and convex (the converses are not true in general). 
  if any convergent b-series with elements of  has its sum in 
  or a  if there exists a Fréchet space  such that  is equal to the projection onto  (via the canonical projection) of some ideally convex subset  of  Every ideally convex set is lower ideally convex. Every lower ideally convex set is convex but the converse is in general not true.

The empty set is convex, ideally convex, bcs-complete, cs-complete, and cs-closed.

Conditions (Hx) and (Hwx) 

Multifunctions 

 The mulifunction  is convex if and only if for all  and all   
 The   is the multifunction  defined by  For any subset  
 The   is 
 The   is  For any subset  

Relationships 

Let  be topological vector spaces,  and  The following implications hold:

complete  cs-complete  cs-closed  lower cs-closed (lcs-closed)  ideally convex.
lower cs-closed (lcs-closed)  ideally convex  lower ideally convex (li-convex)  convex.
(Hx)  (Hwx)  convex.

The converse implications do not hold in general.

If  is complete then,
  is cs-complete (respectively, bcs-complete) if and only if  is cs-closed (respectively, ideally convex).
  satisfies (Hx) if and only if  is cs-closed.
  satisfies (Hwx) if and only if  is ideally convex.

If  is complete then,
  satisfies (Hx) if and only if  is cs-complete.
  satisfies (Hwx) if and only if  is bcs-complete.
 If  and  then:
  satisfies (H(x, y)) if and only if  satisfies (Hx).
  satisfies (Hw(x, y)) if and only if  satisfies (Hwx).

 If  satisfies (Hx) then  is cs-closed.
 If  satisfies (Hwx) then  is ideally convex.

Preserved properties 

Let  be a linear subspace of  Let  and  be multifunctions. 

 If  is a cs-closed (resp. ideally convex) subset of  then  is also a cs-closed (resp. ideally convex) subset of  
 If  is first countable then  is cs-closed (resp. cs-complete) if and only if  is closed (resp. complete); moreover, if  is locally convex then  is closed if and only if  is ideally convex. 
 The properties of being cs-closed, lower cs-closed, ideally convex, lower ideally convex, cs-complete, and bcs-complete are all preserved under isomorphisms of topological vector spaces. 
 The intersection of arbitrarily many cs-closed (resp. ideally convex) subsets of  has the same property.
 The Cartesian product of cs-closed (resp. ideally convex) subsets of arbitrarily many topological vector spaces has that same property (in the product space endowed with the product topology).
 The intersection of countably many lower ideally convex (resp. lower cs-closed) subsets of  has the same property.
 The Cartesian product of lower ideally convex (resp. lower cs-closed) subsets of countably many topological vector spaces has that same property (in the product space endowed with the product topology).

Properties 

If  be a non-empty convex subset of a topological vector space  then,
 If  is closed or open then  is cs-closed.
 If  is Hausdorff and finite dimensional then  is cs-closed.

Let  be a Fréchet space,  be a topological vector spaces,  and  be the canonical projection. If  is lower ideally convex (resp. lower cs-closed) then the same is true of 

If  is a barreled first countable space and if  then:
 If  is ideally convex then

See also

Notes

References 

  
 

Theorems in functional analysis